The John M. Wallace Fourplex is a building complex located in southeast Portland, Oregon, United States. It is listed on the National Register of Historic Places.

Further reading

See also
 National Register of Historic Places listings in Southeast Portland, Oregon

References

External links

1915 establishments in Oregon
Bungalow architecture in Oregon
Houses completed in 1915
Portland Eastside MPS
Apartment buildings on the National Register of Historic Places in Portland, Oregon
Sunnyside, Portland, Oregon
Portland Historic Landmarks